Tiffin is a form of cake-like confection composed of crushed biscuits (most commonly digestive biscuits), sugar, syrup, raisins, cherries and cocoa powder, often covered with a layer of melted striped chocolate. Unlike regular cakes, Tiffin does not require baking. Instead, following preparation of the mixture, the confection is chilled until set. As a consequence the product may also be known as "fridge cake" or another similar term. It was invented in the early 1900s in Troon, Scotland.

Products 
The confectioner Cadbury produces a chocolate bar called Tiffin, consisting of biscuit pieces and raisins in chocolate, as part of its Dairy Milk range.

See also 
 Hedgehog slice
 Icebox cake
 Rocky road
 Tinginys

References 

Confectionery
Chocolate desserts